Ralph Leslie Holloway, Jr. (born 1935) is a physical anthropologist at Columbia University and research associate with the American Museum of Natural History.  Since obtaining his Ph.D from the University of California, Berkeley in 1964, Holloway has served as a professor of anthropology at Columbia.  Holloway's interests lie in craniology, producing endocasts, primate behavior, biology of gender, sexual dimorphism in the corpus callosum, and other topics.

Holloway's work on the Taung Child was one of the first to suggest brain reorganization occurring before the increase of brain size in hominids.  His claim that the lunate sulcus, a sulcus which marks the boundary of the occipital lobe, was in a posterior position to that of apes suggests that the reduction of the occipital lobe was accompanied by enlargements of parts of the brain associated with higher cognitive function.

See also
 The Mismeasure of Man#Craniometry

References

Related readings

External links
Holloway's Columbia Website

1935 births
Living people
Columbia University faculty
American anthropologists
People associated with the American Museum of Natural History